Mario Botta (born 1 April 1943) is a Swiss architect.

Career
Botta designed his first building, a two-family house at Morbio Superiore in Ticino, at age 16. He graduated from the Università Iuav di Venezia (1969). While the arrangements of spaces in this structure is inconsistent, its relationship to its site, separation of living from service spaces, and deep window recesses echo of what would become his stark, strong, towering style. His designs tend to include a strong sense of geometry, often being based on very simple shapes, yet creating unique volumes of space. His buildings are often made of brick, yet his use of material is wide, varied, and often unique.

His trademark style can be seen widely in Switzerland particularly the Ticino region and also in the Mediatheque in Villeurbanne (1988), a cathedral in Évry (1995), and the San Francisco Museum of Modern Art or SFMOMA (1994). He also designed the Europa-Park Dome, which houses many major events at the Europa-Park theme park resort in Germany. Religious works by Botta, including the Cymbalista Synagogue and Jewish Heritage Center were shown in London at the Royal Institute of British Architects in an exhibition entitled, Architetture del Sacro: Prayers in Stone. “A church is the place, par excellence, of architecture,” he said in an interview with architectural historian Judith Dupré. “When you enter a church, you already are part of what has transpired and will transpire there. The church is a house that puts a believer in a dimension where he or she is the protagonist.  The sacred directly lives in the collective. Man becomes a participant in a church, even if he never says anything.”

In 1998, he designed the new bus station for Vimercate (near Milan), a red brick building linked to many facilities, underlining the city's recent development.
He worked at La Scala's theatre renovation, which proved controversial as preservationists feared that historic details would be lost. 

In 2004, he designed Museum One of the Leeum, Samsung Museum of Art in Seoul, South Korea. On January 1, 2006 he received the Grand Officer award from President of the Italian Republic Carlo Azeglio Ciampi. In 2006, he designed his first ever spa, the Bergoase Spa in Arosa, Switzerland. The spa opened in December 2006 and cost an estimated CHF 35 million. Mario Botta participated in the Stock Exchange of Visions project in 2007. He was a member of the Jury of the Global Holcim Awards in 2012. In 2014, he was awarded with the Prize Javier Carvajal by the Universidad de Navarra.

Gallery

References

Sources
 Markus Breitschmid (ed.), Architecture and the Ambient – Mario Botta. Architectura et Ars Series, Volume 2, Virginia Tech Architecture Publications, 2013.

External links

 
Official website

 
2007 Interview with Mario Botta in The Leaf Review
 Stock Exchange Of Visions: Visions of Mario Botta (Video Interviews)
STORIES OF HOUSES: A Family House at Riva San Vitale, by Mario Botta
Santa Maria degli Angeli Monte Tamaro
Mario Botta Architecture on Google maps
Mario Botta. To be an architect, free online course on FutureLearn.com

20th-century Swiss architects
21st-century Swiss architects
Modernist architects
Postmodern architects
 01
1943 births
Living people
Architects from Ticino
People from Mendrisio
Members of the Académie d'architecture
Ratzinger Prize laureates